Frédéric Gorny (born 6 September 1973, in Asnières-sur-Seine) is a French actor known for his role as attorney Pierre Clément on the television series Cherif. He performed in more than forty films since 1994.

Select filmography

External links 
 

1973 births
Living people
People from Asnières-sur-Seine
French male television actors
French male stage actors